The Athmac was a short-lived cyclecar which was manufactured by Athmac Motor Company of Leyton, then in Essex (now part of Greater London) in 1913. The friction-driven car, named 10/12, was propelled by a 1,110 cc four-cylinder engine. It featured final drive by long belts to the rear axle and was supposed to sell at 120 guineas, but production never quite got off the ground.

See also
 List of car manufacturers of the United Kingdom

References

Vintage vehicles
Defunct motor vehicle manufacturers of England
Cyclecars
Companies based in the London Borough of Waltham Forest